M. Claire Cross  is a British historian and professor emeritus in history at the University of York. She was president of the Ecclesiastical History Society from 1989 to 19990.

Education 
Cross studied at the University of Cambridge before becoming county archivist for Cambridgeshire. She also studied at the Huntingdon Library in California, then held a research fellowship at the University of Reading before becoming lecturer at the University of York (1965-2000).

Career 
Cross was a visiting fellow at Girton College, Cambridge from 1990 to 1991. She was president of the Ecclesiastical History Society from 1989 to 1990 and the Society presented her with a festschrift, Life and Thought in the Northern Church, c.1100-1700 in 1999 and made her an honorary fellow in 2000. Cross was chair and later vice-president of the British Association for Local History.

Awards & recognition 
Cross was elected a fellow of the Society of Antiquaries, Royal Historical Society, Historical Association, and was awarded an honorary D.Litt. by the University of Lincoln.

Bibliography 
 Church and people, 1450-1660 : the triumph of the laity in the English church (Atlantic Highlands, N.J.: Humanities Press, 1976;  second edition 1999)
 The royal supremacy in the Elizabethan Church (London, Allen & Unwin; New York, Barnes & Noble, 1969)
 (and D. M. Loades,J. J. Scarisbrick), Law and government under the Tudors: essays presented to Sir Geoffrey Elton, Regius Professor of Modern History in the University of Cambridge, on the occasion of his retirement (Cambridge; New York: Cambridge University Press, 1988)
 The puritan Earl: the life of Henry Hastings, third Earl of Huntingdon, 1536-1595 (London, Melbourne Macmillan; New York, St. Martin's P., 1966)
 Urban magistrates and ministers: religion in Hull and Leeds from the Reformation to the Civil War (Borthwick Papers No. 67, York: University of York, 1985).
 The Free Grammar School of Leicester (Leicester University Press, 1953)
 The Letters of Sir Francis Hastings, 1574-1609, Somerset Record Society (1969)
 York Clergy Wills 1520-1600:  1 The Minster Clergy, Borthwick Texts and  Calendars:  Records of the Northern Province, 10 (York, 1984).
 York Clergy Wills 1520-1600:  2. The City Clergy, Borthwick Texts and Calendars: Records of the Northern Province 15 (York, 1989).

References 

21st-century English historians
Academics of the University of Reading
Academics of the University of York
Alumni of the University of Cambridge
Presidents of the Ecclesiastical History Society
British historians of religion
Fellows of the Society of Antiquaries of London
Fellows of the Royal Historical Society
1932 births
Living people